Filip Bajtek (born April 6, 1991) is a Czech-born Slovak professional ice hockey winger playing for HK Nitra of the Slovak Extraliga.

Bajtek played one game for HC Oceláři Třinec during the 2011–12 Czech Extraliga season. In 2013, he joined HK Nitra of the Tipsport Liga where he spent four seasons. On August 6, 2017, Bajtek moved to Frýdek-Místek of the WSM Liga before returning to Slovakia with HC Nové Zámky on May 25, 2018.

References

External links
 

1991 births
Living people
Czech ice hockey forwards
HK Nitra players
HC Nové Zámky players
HC Oceláři Třinec players
Sportspeople from Třinec
VHK Vsetín players
Slovak ice hockey forwards